The Women's individual sprint at the 2006 Commonwealth Games took place on March 18, 2006 at the Vodafone Arena.

Qualification
Seeding is decided by a 200-metre time trial.

Results

Quarter-finals

Quarter-finals Repechage

Race for 5th-6th Places

Semi-finals

Finals

External links
 Qualification
 Quarter-finals
 Quarter-finals Repechage
 Race for 5th-6th Places
 Semi-finals
 Finals

Track cycling at the 2006 Commonwealth Games
Cycling at the Commonwealth Games – Women's sprint
Comm